This page lists long-distance footpaths in Scotland. This definition is consistent with that of the British Long Distance Walkers Association.

Classification

Under Scots law the public has a right to responsible access to most land in Scotland, in accordance with the Scottish Outdoor Access Code, and access rights for new routes do not generally require to be negotiated. Many named walks have therefore been developed by local authorities, tourist organisations and guidebook authors. There is thus no single register or list of such paths, however some classifications have been developed by Scottish Natural Heritage (SNH):

Scotland's Great Trails: these are routes judged as meeting standards defined by Scottish Natural Heritage. Each of the routes is clearly waymarked with a dedicated symbol, and run largely off-road. They are primarily intended for walkers, but may have sections suitable for cyclists and horse-riders. One of the trails, the Great Glen Canoe Trail, is designed for canoeists and kayakers.  
Heritage paths are routes that have historically been used for a specific purpose, such as Roman roads, drove roads, pilgrimage routes and miners’ paths.
Themed routes are routes based on a specific topic, such as the social history or literary associations of the area through which the route passes.
Virtual routes are routes which have do not have any official recognition or waymarking, but which have been promoted via media outlets such as websites, guidebooks or television programmes.  A subcategory of these routes are "epic routes", defined as being routes that provide challenging travel over often rough ground in more remote ‘wild country’, being suitable for more experienced walkers with good navigation skills. These routes are not waymarked, so as to protect the ‘wild country’ qualities and to retain the element of challenge.  

List of Trails

References

See also
List of long-distance footpaths in the United Kingdom